DownThemAll! (DTA) is a free software download manager browser extension. DTA can download all or some linked files, images, or embedded objects associated with a webpage. It can pause, resume, or restart downloads.

As with any download manager, the main feature of DTA is multi-part downloading. This allows the user to download the file in pieces, then combine the pieces after a completed download. This increases the download speed when connected to a slow server. It has Metalink support, which allows multiple URLs for each file to be used, along with checksums and other information about the content.  Multi-part downloading- also referred to as segmented downloading - is no longer possible with the migration to webextension.  Other features no longer supported as a web extension are checksum/hash verification, metalinks, and mirror sources.

When extracting links from a page, the user may choose to download only specific files (for example: all PDFs) using wildcard or regular expression inclusive filters.

All DTA versions below 4.0 are incompatible with Firefox 57 or above (Quantum). DTA 4.0 moved the codebase from XUL to WebExtensions. The first 4.0 beta version was released August 21, 2019. On September 1, 2019, DownThemAll! 4.0 was released, supporting Quantum. On September 8, 2019, DownThemAll! 4.0.9 was released for Chrome and Opera add-ons.

DownThemAll! was reviewed by Lifehacker, Wired, Spiegel Online, Tucows.

References

External links

 
 Complete list of features
 DownThemAll! on the Mozilla Add-ons website

Download managers
Free Firefox WebExtensions